Moreux may refer to:

 Jean-Charles Moreux (1889–1956), French architect
 Théophile Moreux (1867–1954), French astronomer and meteorologist
 Moreux (crater), a crater in the Ismenius Lacus quadrangle on Mars
 14914 Moreux, minor planet